Playa Balandra is a beach located on the Baja California Sur peninsula of Mexico in La Paz.  It is located on the Eastern side of the peninsula, but faces west, as the southern tip comes up. This beach is located on Balandra Bay. The water is very shallow, allowing visitors to walk across the bay to the other side. There are also many sandbanks located on this bay. 

Since May of 2020, due to the COVID-19 Pandemic, the beach allows for only 120 visitors per day. It is recommended by local guides in La Paz to drive up at 6am (earlier on the weekends) to have a chance to enter Playa Balandra. Another option is to take a local boat tour that takes visitors to the other beaches along Balandra Bay.

External links

Beaches of Baja California Sur